Kevin B. Thomas (born 1936) is an American film critic who has written reviews for the Los Angeles Times since 1962. His long tenure makes him the longest-running film critic among major United States newspapers.

Thomas was born in Los Angeles in 1936.  He earned a bachelor's degree from Gettysburg College in 1958 and master's degree from Pennsylvania State University in 1960.

Thomas is known for giving fairly positive reviews compared to other critics, and certainly less critical than Kenneth Turan, who joined the Los Angeles Times in 1991.

In 2003, the National Lesbian and Gay Journalists Association gave Thomas a Lifetime Achievement Award. Thomas holds an honorary position on the Advisory Board of GALECA: The Society of LGBTQ Entertainment Critics and its Dorian Awards.

References

External links
 

1936 births
Living people
American film critics
Gettysburg College alumni
Los Angeles Times people
Pennsylvania State University alumni
Writers from Los Angeles
Journalists from California
20th-century American journalists
American male journalists